"Don't Look Down" is a song by British rock band Bring Me the Horizon that features guest vocals from Foreign Beggars' Orifice Vulgatron. The song premiered on 29 October 2014 during a BBC Radio 1 broadcast and the following day was shown in Zane Lowe's re-score of the movie Drive. "Don't Look Down" is a stand-alone song to promote the film. The track was released via SoundCloud for free on 29 October 2014, though was later removed.

Composition
"Don't Look Down" has been described as a post-hardcore, drum and bass, hip hop, and dubstep song.

Critical reception
Many fans were unhappy with the track due to the inclusion of hip hop and dubstep music on it, which had never been done before in any Bring Me the Horizon song. Within a day of the song's release, the band issued a statement regarding the matter on their Twitter page.

References

2014 singles
Bring Me the Horizon songs
Songs written by Oliver Sykes
Wikipedia requested audio of songs
Drum and bass songs
Dubstep songs
British hip hop songs